Victor Omar Antoine N’Diaye (born June 1, 1992) is a Canadian soccer player who currently plays for Toulouse Rodéo.

Career

Collegial Scholar League RSEQ
N'Diaye played with the Cegep de Sainte-Foy Dynamiques in 2009 and for the Cégep Garneau Élans in 2010

Montreal Impact
N'Diaye played with the Montreal Impact Academy in the Canadian Soccer League. He also played for Montreal Impact U23 in the Premier Development League.

N'Diaye joined FC Montreal, a USL affiliate club of the Montreal Impact for the 2015 season.  On March 28, 2015, he made his professional debut for the club in a 2–0 defeat to Toronto FC II.

Mont-Royal Outremont
In 2016 N'Diaye joined PLSQ side CS Mont-Royal Outremont and made five appearances for the Montreal club, scoring one goal.

Toulouse Rodéo
On 30 January 2017, N'Diaye moved abroad, signing with French CFA2 club Toulouse Rodéo. In the final half of the 2016–17 season N'Diaye made 13 appearances, scoring three goals.

References

External links

1992 births
Living people
Association football forwards
Canadian expatriate soccer players
Canadian Soccer League (1998–present) players
Canadian soccer players
FC Montreal players
Montreal Impact U23 players
USL League Two players
Soccer people from Quebec
Sportspeople from Quebec City
USL Championship players
CS Mont-Royal Outremont players
Première ligue de soccer du Québec players